The following is a complete list of books published by Stephen King, an American author of contemporary horror, suspense, science fiction, and fantasy. His books have sold more than 400 million copies, and many of them have been adapted into feature films, television movies and comic books. King has published 65 novels, including seven under the pen name Richard Bachman, and five non-fiction books. He has written over 200 short stories, most of which have been compiled in book collections. Many of his stories are set in his home state of Maine.

Novels

Collections

Nonfiction

Screenplays

Others

See also

 Stephen King short fiction bibliography
 Unpublished and uncollected works by Stephen King
 List of adaptations of works by Stephen King

References

External links
 Stephen King bibliography timeline on Histropedia

 
Bibliographies by writer
Bibliographies of American writers
Horror fiction bibliographies